IADB may refer to:
 Inter-American Development Bank, an international organization to support Latin American and Caribbean economic and social development and regional integration
 Inter-American Defense Board, an international committee of nationally appointed defense officials in North, Central, and South America
 Integrated Archaeological Database, an open-source web-based application for archaeological excavation projects